On the Way is the seventeenth album by Jandek, released in 1988 as Corwood 0755. It was reissued on CD in 2002.

Track listing

External links 
Seth Tisue's On the Way review

Jandek albums
Corwood Industries albums
1988 albums